The Sagan River is a seasonal river in southern Ethiopia. 

It defines part of the boundary between the Southern Nations, Nationalities, and Peoples' Region and the Oromia Region.

Tributaries of the Sagan include the Talpeena.

See also
List of rivers of Ethiopia

Rivers of Ethiopia
Ethiopian Highlands
Geography of Oromia Region
Southern Nations, Nationalities, and Peoples' Region